Taikoo Hui Guangzhou is a multi-use complex in Tianhe District of Guangzhou, China. The project consists of a large indoor shopping mall, two Grade-A office towers, Guangzhou's first five-star Mandarin Oriental Hotel, serviced apartments and a cultural centre. The 358,000 square metre property was designed by American company Arquitectonica, and is managed by Hong Kong-based Swire Properties.

Location & accessibility
The complex is located close to the junction of Tianhe Road and Tianhe East Road with visitors able to park at the shopping centre. The complex is also well-served by public transport, with visitors recommended to alight at Tianhe Sports Center and Shipaiqiao stations which are directly connected to lines 1 and 3 of the Guangzhou Metro.

History
In 2001, Swire Properties (55%) and Guangzhou Daily (45%) signed a Memorandum of Understanding for developing a multi-use complex in Tianhe District of Guangzhou. In 2002, Swire Properties and Guangzhou Daily signed an agreement of 4 billion investment to develop and build a multi-use complex called "Taikoo Hui – Guangzhou Daily Group Cultural Plaza". In 2004, Swire Properties signed a revised joint venture agreement with the Guangzhou Daily Group to increase its stake in the Taikoo Hui commercial and cultural complex in Guangzhou to 97%.

On 23 September 2011, Taikoo Hui was officially opened.

References

External links
 

Shopping malls in Guangzhou
Swire Group
Tianhe District